Southern Katipo is a military exercise that occurs every two years run by the New Zealand Defence Force (NZDF) within New Zealand. It is the largest exercise of the NZDF. It involves many different organizations including both military and civilian organizations, and even can involve members of the public. A multinational and joint exercise involving air, ground and naval forces, foreign partners have included Australia, Canada, Tonga, Malaysia, Singapore, Timor Leste, Papua New Guinea, Fiji, France, Chile, New Caledonia, the United States and the United Kingdom.

References

External links
 Foreigners invade New Zealand for Southern Katipo 
 Southern Katipo to Kick off in New Zealand

Military exercises and wargames